This is a list of seasons played by Hamburger SV in German and European football.

Oberliga Nord (1947–63)

Bundesliga and 2. Bundesliga (1963–)

Key
Top scorer shown in bold when he was also the league's highest or joint highest scorer.

Pld = Matches played
W = Matches won
D = Matches drawn
L = Matches lost
GF = Goals for
GA = Goals against
Pts = Points
Pos = Final position

BL = Bundesliga
2.BL = 2. Bundesliga
OLN= Oberliga Nord
RL = Regionalliga
GL = Gauliga

NH = Not held
GS = Group stage
R1 = Round 1
R2 = Round 2
R3 = Round 3
R4 = Round 4
QF = Quarter-finals 
SF = Semi-finals
F  = Final

Notes
A.  Hamburg received a four-point deduction for making illegal payments to Willi Schröder.
B.  Defeated Greuther Fürth in the relegation play-off.
C.  Defeated Karlsruher SC in the relegation play-off.
D.  Lost to Hertha BSC in the promotion play-off.

References 
 Hamburger SV at Fußballdaten.de (in German)
  (in German)

 
Hamburger SV seasons
Hamburger SV
Hamburger SV